High15 is a Swedish girl group. They met at a Stage Academy camp, a musical education to which they had all applied at the age of 12. They first started receiving attention for their covers, which they published on YouTube. They participated in Talang 2017 which was broadcast on TV4 in Sweden, where they made it to the semifinals. On 13 April 2018, the band released the music single "Adios". In 2019, they participated in Melodifestivalen with the song "No drama". They performed the song in the first semifinal in Gothenburg on 2 February 2019, where they finished in 6th place. The band consists of members  Amie Parfitt, Lleucu Young, Alva Lindgren and Tiana Salmon. When they met, none of them lived in the same area. Parfitt comes from Lilla Beddinge in Skåne, Salmon from Stockholm, Lindgren from Sundsvall and Young from Hanko, Finland.

On 4 February 2019, the group's song "No Drama" entered the Spotify 200 chart at place 46.

Discography

References

External links 

Swedish pop music groups
Melodifestivalen contestants of 2019